David Haddow (12 June 1869 – 14 April 1955) was a Scottish professional footballer who played as a goalkeeper. He won one cap for Scotland, in 1894.

In 1890, Haddow was involved in an altercation between players from Airdrieonians and his team, local rivals Albion Rovers. The charge was not proven. He won a Scottish Cup (1894) and two Glasgow Cups in a four-year spell with Rangers, and won the Southern Football League title in his time at Tottenham Hotspur as a replacement for the injured George Clawley.

References

Sources

1869 births
1955 deaths
Footballers from South Lanarkshire
Scottish footballers
Scotland international footballers
Association football goalkeepers
Derby County F.C. players
Rangers F.C. players
Burnley F.C. players
New Brighton Tower F.C. players
English Football League players
Scottish Football League players
Southern Football League players
Albion Rovers F.C. players
Tottenham Hotspur F.C. players
Motherwell F.C. players
Scottish Football League representative players
Place of death missing